Jeryl Prescott Sales is an American actress, best known for her role as Jacqui in the AMC series The Walking Dead. In 2019, she had series regular role of Madame Xanadu in the short-lived DC Universe series Swamp Thing.

Life and career
Prescott was born in Washington, D.C., then adopted and raised in Hartsville, South Carolina. She is best known for her role as Jacqui in Season 1 of the television series The Walking Dead, which premiered on AMC in 2010. Prescott, a resident of Winston-Salem, North Carolina, divides her time between that city and Los Angeles. Prescott was originally cast for just two episodes of the premiere season of The Walking Dead. However, her character, Jacqui, was then written into the series cast of the season as well. Prescott reprises her role as Jacqui in the Season 3 episode "Hounded", as one of the voices that speaks to Rick on the phone.

Later,  Prescott recurred as Cherry in Ray Donovan on Showtime.  Prescott also appeared as a Judge Delilah Nunes in the Criminal Minds: Suspect Behavior, which debuted on CBS in 2011. Additionally, Prescott  appeared as Felicite in the film, Bolden! (2011). She has also cast in a film, produced by Harry Lennix, based on William Shakespeare's Henry IV, Part 1. On television, she also guest-starred on Brothers & Sisters, Southland, Parks and Recreation and Revolution. She also has appeared in films The Birth of a Nation (2016) and High Flying Bird (2019).

Prescott had a recurring role during the second season of Ray Donovan in 2014, and the following year on the adaptation of the comic book series Powers. She guest starred on NCIS: Los Angeles, Scandal, and Shameless. In 2019, she was cast in her first series regular role, on the DC Universe series Swamp Thing playing the role of Madame Xanadu. The series was canceled after one season.

Filmography

Film

Television

References

External links

Date of birth unknown
Actresses from North Carolina
Actors from Winston-Salem, North Carolina
Actresses from Los Angeles
Living people
21st-century American actresses
American television actresses
African-American actresses
American film actresses
Actresses from South Carolina
People from Hartsville, South Carolina
1964 births
21st-century African-American women
21st-century African-American people
20th-century African-American people
20th-century African-American women